The 1927–28 City Cup was the thirtieth edition of the City Cup, a cup competition in Northern Irish football.

The tournament was won by Belfast Celtic for the 4th time.

Group standings

References

1927–28 in Northern Ireland association football